The Stockton Subdivision is a railroad line in the U.S. state of California owned by the BNSF Railway. It runs from the Port of Richmond, where trains interchange with the Richmond Pacific Railroad, to Fresno where the railway continues south as the Bakersfield Subdivision or the Union Pacific Fresno Subdivision. The line was originally constructed by the San Francisco and San Joaquin Valley Railroad in the late 1890s before being acquired by the Atchison, Topeka and Santa Fe Railway. BNSF spent $17.5 million to upgrade track, bridges, and crossings along the line in 2005.

Amtrak San Joaquins trains operate over the line from Bakersfield to Port Chicago. Part of the right of way in and around Madera is planned to be utilized for the California High-Speed Rail line.

References

External links
BNSF Subdivisions

Rail lines in California
BNSF Railway lines